Shirley Yu Sha-Li is a Hong Kong actress.

She won the 1974 Miss Hong Kong pageant, organized by the Miss Pearl of the Orient Company.

Selected filmography
 Gambler's Delight (1981)  	
 Seed of Evil (1981)
 Hex Vs Witchcraft (1980)	
 Bastard Swordsman, The Grand Conclusion (1979)	
 The Ghost Story (1979)	
 Life Gamble (1979)	
 Scandalous Warlord (1979)	
 The Brave Archer 2 (1978) 	
 Sensual Pleasures (1978)	
 The Call Girls (1977)	
 Chinatown Kid (1977) 	
 Confessions of a Private Secretary (1977)	
 Dreams of Eroticism (1977)	
 Lady Exterminator (1977)	
 Love Swindlers (1976)	
 Moods of Love (1976)

Notes

References

External links
 
 HK cinemagic entry
 brns.com entry

20th-century Hong Kong actresses
Living people
Year of birth missing (living people)